Charles Edward Trail (28 January 1826 – 11 May 1909) was a prominent Frederick County, Maryland, landowner, businessman and a member of the Maryland General Assembly, an officer in the 1st Maryland Infantry, Potomac Home Brigade as well as a member of the City council of Frederick, Maryland.

Life and works
Charles Edward Trail was born on January 28, 1826, in Frederick, Maryland, to Edward Traill (sic, 1798 – 1876) and Lydia Ramsburg (1802 – 18?) in Frederick, Maryland.  The 1850 census records show that Trail was a young lawyer living with his parents in Frederick town.

In 1851, Trail married Ariana McElfresh, the daughter of one of the wealthiest landowners in Frederick, John H. McElfresh (1796 – 1841). Ariana's mother was the former Theresa Mantz. Her father was born near New Market, Frederick County, Maryland, the son of Henry and Ariana (Hammond) McElfresh and attended Frederick College; University of Maryland Medical School, 1817 as well as studying Medicine under Dr. L. T. Hammond, of Anne Arundel County, 1813 and then law under John Nelson of Frederick; admitted to the bar, 1825. They had several children, including the author, Florence Trail.

Trail received a classical education at Frederick College,and was admitted to the bar in 1849. In 1852, Trail was one of the founding incorporators for the Mount Olivet cemetery in Frederick Maryland. In the 1860 census, Trail was listed again as a lawyer but with property valued at $115,000|$US, a wife (Ariana), four children. The separate 1860 Slave census shows Trail with three slaves. That same year, Trail was elected president of the Isabella gas works company in Frederick, eventually becoming the sole stock holder.

In August 1862, Trail was appointed lieutenant-colonel, 1st Maryland Infantry, Potomac Home Brigade. Seven companies of which were mustered into service and encamped in August near the turnpike, about a mile and a half north of Frederick. On October 15, 1869, President U.S. Grant and his party (including General Sherman) stayed in Frederick in 1869 while visiting the Antietam battleground. General Sherman stayed with Trail during the visit.

He began his political career as a member of the Maryland General Assembly representing Frederick County: House of Delegates (R), 1863 thru 1864; then in the Senate (R), 1865 thru 1867. In 1870, he was president of the board of aldermen for the City of Frederick, a post he held for three years. That same year he was elected a director of the Frederick and Pennsylvania Line Railroad Company and then President of the railroad in 1878.

On 12 June 1877, Trail was injured in a Baltimore & Ohio railroad train wreck at Point of Rocks by a train bound to Washington and Mt. Vernon. Five persons were killed outright, and a large number seriously injured when two passenger coaches filled with excursionists to Washington and Mt. Vernon were telescoped. Trail was rescued from the smashup by John C. Hardt & William S. Bennett

In 1878, Trail became president of the Farmers' and Mechanics' bank of Frederick County. The bank had been raided by Confederate troops during the civil war and lost $17,000|US$. In 1881, Trail was made a director for the Mutual Insurance company of Frederick County.

Death
Trail died on May 11, 1909, in Frederick, Maryland, and is buried at Mount Olivet Cemetery in Frederick. One of his great-grandsons was three-term U.S. Senator Charles "Mac" Mathias of Maryland.

References

External links 
Charles E. Trail Main Biography Page

1826 births
1909 deaths
Members of the Maryland House of Delegates
Maryland state senators
American railroad pioneers
Politicians from Frederick, Maryland
Burials at Mount Olivet Cemetery (Frederick, Maryland)
19th-century American politicians